Zaborye is a rural locality (a village) and the administrative center of Zaboryinskoye Rural Settlement, Beryozovsky District, Perm Krai, Russia. The population was 522 as of 2010. There are 4 streets.

Geography 
Zaborye is located 10 km southwest of  Beryozovka (the district's administrative centre) by road. Karnaukhovo is the nearest rural locality.

References 

Rural localities in Beryozovsky District, Perm Krai